Cyperus nyasensis is a species of sedge that is native to parts of eastern Africa.

See also 
 List of Cyperus species

References 

nyasensis
Plants described in 1983
Flora of Malawi
Flora of Tanzania
Taxa named by Kåre Arnstein Lye